Block art may refer to:

Art built from Lego
ANSI art
PETSCII art
Box-drawing characters
Text semigraphics